Douburji Virkan is a village in Nowshera Virkan Tehsil, Gujranwala District, Punjab, Pakistan. It is part of Constituency NA-100.

References

Villages in Gujranwala District
Populated places in Wazirabad Tehsil